Viliame "Pila" Iongi (born 8 August 1989) is a Tongan national rugby union player. He has played for Tonga. Iongi has 12 caps for Tonga and scored seven tries, four coming on his debut in the Churchill Cup against United States.

Iongi played in Australia with the Queanbeyan Whites for two seasons, winning the ACTRU Premier Division title in 2010.
His impressive performances in 2010 earned him a spot in the Brumbies academy for the 2011 season.

In October 2011, Iongi signed for the Llanelli-based Welsh regional side, the Scarlets. Iongi made a bright start to his Scarlets career scoring four tries in his first four starts; tries against Ulster and Northampton Saints were followed by a brace against London Irish in the Anglo-Welsh Cup. He left the region in the summer of 2012.

On 4 April 2014, Iongi returned to England to sign for Nottingham in the RFU Championship for the 2014–15 season.

References

External links
 Scarlets Profile

1989 births
Living people
Scarlets players
Tongan rugby union players
Tonga international rugby union players
ACT Brumbies players
Tongan expatriate rugby union players
Expatriate rugby union players in Australia
Expatriate rugby union players in Wales
Tongan expatriate sportspeople in Australia
Tongan expatriate sportspeople in Wales
People from Tongatapu
San Francisco Rush players
Rugby union scrum-halves